"Critical Love" is a song of A1 written by Mathilde Johnson. The song became their newest single after winning the show in Norway called The Hit on 3 October 2014.

Background
A1 chose the song "Physical Love", written by 24-year-old Mathilde Johnson from Nøtterøy and went with it to the very top. The song was, however, renamed and is now called "Critical Love".

Track listing
 Digital download
 "Critical Love" - 3:31

References

2014 songs
A1 (band) songs
2014 singles